Ancylostoma is a genus of nematodes that includes some species of hookworms.

Species include:
 Ancylostoma braziliense, commonly infects cats, popularly known in Brazil as bicho-geográfico
 Ancylostoma caninum, commonly infects dogs
 Ancylostoma ceylanicum
 Ancylostoma duodenale
 Ancylostoma pluridentatum, commonly infects sylvatic cats 
 Ancylostoma tubaeforme, infects cats along with other hosts

See also 
 Ancylostomiasis
 List of parasites (human)

External links 
 

Ancylostomatidae
Rhabditida genera